Markazul Ma'arif, is a Voluntary Social-welfare Non-Government Organisation in India. The organisation strives to work for the upliftment of economically and educationally backward segment of society. Since its inception Markazul Ma’arif has been uninterruptedly materializing various schemes and plans in different fields. Markaz has already carved a niche for itself in the heart of people with its wide network of activities throughout the country. [./Https://markazulmaarif.org/ Markazul Ma’arif] plays an active role in relief and rehabilitation operation for victims of natural calamities. It caters to the need of the people irrespective of their caste, creed and religion by providing them with food, clothing and medicine. The organization is registered under Society Registration Act XXI of 1860 Regd. No. 187/83-84 (XXI of SR Act – 1860)

Activities
Markazul Ma'arif is running several school and scholarship endowment in Hojai and Nagaon District. Some of them are 

English Medium Schools - More than 40 Nos.
Industrial Training Centre - 01 Nos
Krishi Vikas Kendra under Agriculture Department - 01 Nos
Merit Scholarships
Medical and Marriage Aid
Emergency Relief and Rehabilitation
Computer and Vocational Training Centres - 19 Nos.
Health Care and Sanitation Schemes
Drinking Water supply schemes
Social Forestry and Environment Promotion schemes
Monthly aid to Poor, Widows and Differently able persons.

References

External links
 Official website

Orphanages in India
Charities based in India
Islamic organisations based in India
Educational organisations based in India